was a town located in Nishikasugai District, Aichi Prefecture, Japan.

As of 2003, the town had an estimated population of 18,761 and a population density of 3,991.70 persons per km². The total area was 4.70 km².

On July 7, 2005, Shinkawa, along with the towns of Kiyosu (former) and Nishibiwajima (all from Nishikasugai District), was merged to create the city of Kiyosu.

Dissolved municipalities of Aichi Prefecture
Kiyosu, Aichi